The Azure Swimming Pool is one of the indoor swimming pools in the abandoned city of Pripyat, Ukraine, which was affected by the 1986 Chernobyl nuclear disaster.

History
The complex was built in the 1970s and remained in use until 1998 (12 years after the Chernobyl nuclear disaster); during those 12 years the swimming pool was mainly used by Chernobyl liquidators. The swimming pool was considered to be one of the cleanest places in Pripyat.
 However, the swimming pool and the adjacent indoor basketball court have been abandoned and left to decay since its closure in 1998.

In popular culture

The swimming pool appears in the following:
 Ukrainian writer Markiyan Kamysh's novel A Stroll to the Zone, which is centred around illegal trips to Pripyat
 The video game Call of Duty 4: Modern Warfare in the mission "One Shot, One Kill" and also in the multiplayer map "Bloc"
 Music video of the song "Marooned" by English rock band Pink Floyd
 Music video of the song "Sweet People" by Ukrainian singer Alyosha
 The short film Postcards from Pripyat, filmed by CBS cameraman Danny Cooke
 Chinese technology company DJI's story, Lost City of Chernobyl
 The video game PUBG: Battlegrounds
 Music video of the song "Life Is Golden", by English rock band Suede (along with other locations in Pripyat)
The video game Warface
The video game Call of Duty: Warzone
The video game Metro Exodus "Sam's Story" DLC
The HBO miniseries Chernobyl
The video game S.T.A.L.K.E.R.: Shadow of Chernobyl
At a location called 'The Storage' in the video game Secondlife

Gallery

See also
Avanhard Stadium of Pripyat
Chernobyl Exclusion Zone

References

External links

 Photographs of the Azure Swimming Pool in 2016

Buildings and structures in Pripyat
Swimming pools
Chernobyl Exclusion Zone
Swimming venues in Ukraine
1970s establishments in Ukraine
1998 disestablishments in Ukraine